Jameson Distillery Bow St. (informally the Jameson Distillery) is an Irish whiskey tourist attraction located just off Smithfield Square in Dublin, Ireland. Jameson Distillery Bow St. is the original site where Jameson Irish Whiskey was distilled until 1971. It is now a visitors centre that provides guided tours, tutored whiskey tastings, JJs bar and a gift shop.

History 
The original distillery on this site was called the Bow Street Distillery and was established in 1780. John Jameson took full ownership (he was previously the general manager) and expanded the distillery in 1805. By 1810, the operation was officially renamed to John Jameson & Son’s Bow Street Distillery. The distillery grew to upwards of 5 acres (2 ha) in size by 1886.

At this time, it was described by many as a "city within a city". The distillery also housed a smithy, cooperage, saw mills, engineers, carpenters, painters and coppersmiths’ shops. Water for the distillery came from two deep wells dug underneath the site. Cellars were also dug underneath nearby streets to store maturing whiskey, while four stills and two wash stills, each holding 24,000 gallons (109,000 litres), were heated by both fire and steam coils above.

Following a difficult period that included American Prohibition, Ireland’s trade war with Great Britain, and the introduction of Scotch blended whiskey, the Jameson distillery fell on hard times and decided to form the Irish Distillers Group with their previous rivals, the Cork Distilleries Company and John Power & Son in 1966. Eventually, it became one of the last distilleries in Ireland to close in 1971. The operation was then moved out of Dublin to the New Midleton Distillery.

See also
Jameson Experience, Midleton

References

Museums established in 1997
Museums in Dublin (city)
Defunct distilleries in Ireland
Drink-related museums
1780 establishments in Ireland
1971 disestablishments in Ireland